Mark Lane Express was a London-based agriculture journal founded in 1832. It was published weekly by Isaac Alger. William Shaw was the first editor of this weekly journal.

References

Defunct newspapers published in the United Kingdom